Mariusz Fyrstenberg and Marcin Matkowski were the defending champions, and won in the final 6–0, 3–6, 10–4, against Nikolay Davydenko and Yuri Schukin.

Seeds

  Mariusz Fyrstenberg /  Marcin Matkowski (champions)
   Marcos Daniel /  Stephen Huss (quarterfinals)
  Michal Mertiňák /  Lovro Zovko (quarterfinals)
  Marcel Granollers /  Santiago Ventura (semifinals)

Draw

Draw

External links
 Draw

Doubles
Orange Warsaw Open
2008 in Polish tennis